The Shikoku proportional representation block is one of eleven proportional representation (PR) "blocks", multi-member constituencies for the House of Representatives in the Diet of Japan. It consists of Shikoku region covering Tokushima, Kagawa, Ehime and Kōchi Prefectures. Following the introduction of proportional voting it elected seven representatives in the 1996 general election. When the total number of PR seats was reduced from 200 to 180, the Shikoku PR block shrunk to six seats.

Summary of results 
With a district magnitude of six, Shikoku is the smallest PR block. The vote share necessary to obtain a seat is usually well above ten percent. In three elections after the consolidation of the LDP-DPJ-party system by the merger of the LP into the DPJ in 2001, only the top three parties were able to win seats in Shikoku. In 2012, the LDP recorded its worst result since the introduction of proportional party list voting and the DPJ vote share crashed by more than 25 percentage points, the newly created Japan Restoration Party managed to gain two proportional seats in Shikoku.

Party names are abbreviated as follows: (Romanisation of Japanese name in brackets):
 LDP: Liberal Democratic Party, (Jiyūminshutō)
 DPJ: Democratic Party of Japan (Minshutō)
 Komeito (Kōmeitō)
 JCP: Japanese Communist Party, (Nihon Kyōsantō)
 SDP Social Democratic Party, Shakaiminshutō
 NFP: New Frontier Party, Shinshintō
 LP: Liberal Party, Jiyūtō
 NSP: New Socialist Party, Shin-shakaitō
 LL: Liberal League, Jiyū-rengō
 HRP: Happiness Realization Party, Kōfuku-jitsugen-tō

List of representatives
Note: Party affiliations as of election day.

Election results

2014 general election

2012 general election

2009 general election

References 

 JANJAN, The Senkyo: Results of general and by-elections for the House of Representatives 1890–2010

Shikoku region
PR Shikoku